Final Run is a 1999 television film, starring Robert Urich. It was written by Michael Braverman and directed by Armand Mastroianni. The film was originally aired at CBS on October 10, 1999. Final Run is a sequel for Final Descent.

Plot
The Grand Royale is a luxury train, which is completely controlled by a computerized system. However, a mistake by the train crew causes it to suffer a glitch and soon it becomes a runaway. With the train being out of control,   old-fashioned Glen "Lucky" Singer (Robert Urich) has to save the day and slow down the train otherwise  a disaster will happen and the train will be destroyed.

Cast
 Robert Urich as Captain Glen 'Lucky' Singer
 Patricia Kalember as Connie Phipps-Singer
 John de Lancie as George Bouchard
 Cathy Lee Crosby as Sandy Holmestead
 Udo Kier as Reddick, Train Control Supervisor
 Scott Vickaryous as Scott Sparkman
 Stephen E. Miller as Lieutenant Colonel Frank O'Hearn
 Jason Schombing as Wilson Fitch, Train Controller 
 Alf Humphreys as Ben Hofflund (as Alfred E. Humphreys)

Reception
Andy Webb from The Movie Scene gave "Final Run" two out five stars. He called the film "so terrible that it is bloody hilarious". "There are movies which have made me cry tears of sadness, there are movies which have intentionally made me cry fits of laughter but "Final Run" made me cry because it is so bad, so terrible that it become hilariously good. In this follow up to "Final Descent" we have a computerized train out of control, a cliche in itself but that is just the first of a long list of cliches from a son not liking his step mum to a selfish Senator not caring about anyone else. Add to this more terrible dialogue and acting than I have seen in a long time and some ropey special effects and instead of being an exciting runaway train disaster movie "Final Run" becomes gloriously bad in so many ways."

References

External links

1999 films
1999 action films
1999 television films
American action films
American television films
Canadian action films
Canadian television films
English-language Canadian films
Films set on trains
Films about railway accidents and incidents
Films directed by Armand Mastroianni
Films scored by Louis Febre
1990s American films
1990s Canadian films
1990s English-language films